Jameela palmyra, the marbled blue, is a butterfly in the family Lycaenidae. It is found in along the coast of Australia (from Queensland to New South Wales), as well as in Indonesia, New Guinea and the Solomon Islands.

The wingspan is about 20 mm. Adult males are iridescent blue, while females have white forewings with a black tip and a blue base. The hindwings of the female are blue with an arc of brown spots.

The larvae feed on Amyema cambagei and Dendrophthoe vitellina. They are green with a rusty suffusion. Pupation takes place in a pale brown pupa with a dark brown spots.

Subspecies
J. p. palmyra (Ambon, Serang, Obi, Bachan, Noemfor)
J. p. clara Tite, 1963 (New Britain)
J. p. coelia (Grose-Smith, 1894) (Aru, Waigeu, West Irian to Papua New Guinea)
J. p. lateplaga Tite, 1963 (Solomon Islands: Florida Island, Roviana)
J. p. tasmanicus (Miskin, 1890) (Tanimbar, Australia: Cape York to Lake Macquarie)

References

Butterflies described in 1860
Polyommatini
Butterflies of Oceania
Butterflies of Indonesia
Taxa named by Baron Cajetan von Felder